Qualification for the 1972 AFC Asian Cup finals held in Thailand.

Zones

 * Withdrew
 **  originally qualified as hosts, but withdrew later
 *** were allocated to Western zone later
  qualified as defending champions

Central Zone 
All matches played in Thailand.

Group allocation matches where winners were divided into separate groups

Group A

Group B

Semifinal

Match for third place

Final

Thailand and Khmer Republic qualified for final tournament

Eastern Zone 

All the others withdrew, so  qualified automatically.

Western Zone 
All matches played in Kuwait.

Group allocation matches where winners were divided into separate groups

Ceylon (Sri Lanka) had a bye

Group A

Group B

Semifinal

Match for third place

Final

Iraq and Kuwait qualified for final tournament

Qualified teams 

 qualified as hosts but later withdrew.  replaced them later.

References

External links
Details at RSSSF
FIFA results record, used to update dates and locationsAl-Hayat''; December 1971

Qual
AFC Asian Cup qualification
Q
International association football competitions hosted by Thailand
International association football competitions hosted by Kuwait